Espen Selvik is a Norwegian conductor, composer, music reviewer in , writer, advisor of the Reksten Foundation and director of Gulatinget. He is also honorary consul of the republic of Lithuania. Selvik has composed five symphonies and two oratorios.

He composed and performed a special piece, for lur (a wooden shepherd's horn), choir and orchestra, marking the visit of Norway's Crown Prince Haakon to Orkney in April 2014. He played a lur originally given to Norway's King Olav V and donated by his son Harold V, to raise funds for a community centre on Orkney.

Compositions

References

External links 
 Kalevala's gentle giants weekly.ahram.org 2003
 Uken14

Norwegian contemporary classical composers
1959 births
Living people
Honorary consuls of Lithuania
Norwegian male classical composers